Singaravelu Thandayuthapani (born 7 August 1950) is a Sri Lankan Tamil teacher, civil servant, politician and provincial minister.

Early life
Thandayuthapani was born on 7 August 1950 and educated at R. K. M. Sri Koneswara Vidyalayam. He graduated with a degree in economics before training to be a teacher at Palali Guru Vidyalayam.

Career
Thandayuthapani was a school principal before becoming a Director of Education and Additional Director of Education. He served as Secretary to the Ministry of Lands, Land Development, Education and Culture (Eastern Province) between 2010 and 2011.

Thandayuthapani contested the 2012 provincial council election as one of the Tamil National Alliance's candidates in Trincomalee District and was elected to the Eastern Provincial Council (EPC). On 28 September 2012 the TNA leadership unanimously selected Thandayuthapani to be the Leader of the Opposition on the EPC. Thandayuthapani and the other newly elected TNA provincial councillors took their oaths on 28 September 2012 in front of TNA leader and Member of Parliament R. Sampanthan.

Following the 2015 presidential election an all party provincial government was formed in the Eastern Province. Thandayuthapani took his oath as Minister of Education in front of Governor Austin Fernando on 3 March 2015.

References

1950 births
Alumni of R. K. M. Sri Koneswara Hindu College
Education ministers of Sri Lankan provinces
Illankai Tamil Arasu Kachchi politicians
Living people
Members of the Eastern Province Board of Ministers
People from Eastern Province, Sri Lanka
Sri Lankan Tamil civil servants
Sri Lankan Tamil politicians
Sri Lankan Tamil teachers
Tamil National Alliance politicians